José Mario Goñi Carrasco (born 28 February 1948) is a Chilean diplomat and politician, currently appointed ambassador to the United States. Before this appointment he had served as Minister of National Defense from 2007 to 2009. His previous diplomatic roles include Ambassador to Mexico, Italy and Sweden. He is a graduate in business majoring in economics of the University of Concepción.

References

External links
 Biography at the Ministry of National Defense 
 Biography at the Ministry General Government Secretariat

University of Concepción alumni
Living people
Chilean Ministers of Defense
Recipients of the Order of the Liberator General San Martin
Ambassadors of Chile to the United States
Ambassadors of Chile to Mexico
Ambassadors of Chile to Italy
Ambassadors of Chile to Sweden
1948 births
People from Concepción, Chile
Party for Democracy (Chile) politicians